iJuander is a Philippine television news magazine show broadcast by GMA News TV and GTV. Originally hosted by Susan Enriquez and Cesar Apolinario, it premiered on February 28, 2011. Enriquez and Mark Salazar currently serve as the hosts.

Hosts

 Susan Enriquez 
 Mark Salazar 

Former host
Cesar Apolinario

Overview
iJuander showcases aspects of Philippine culture such as beliefs, traditions, mysteries, folklore and cuisine

In February 2021, GMA News TV was rebranded as GTV, with the show being carried over.

Production
The production was halted in March 2020 due to the enhanced community quarantine in Luzon caused by the COVID-19 pandemic. The show resumed its programming on September 20, 2020.

Accolades

References

External links
 
 

2011 Philippine television series debuts
Filipino-language television shows
GMA Integrated News and Public Affairs shows
GMA News TV original programming
GTV (Philippine TV network) original programming
Philippine documentary television series
Television productions suspended due to the COVID-19 pandemic